The Academy of the Armed Forces of Uzbekistan is a body for the training of highly qualified military personnel for the Armed Forces of the Republic of Uzbekistan. It was originally established as an inter-service educational institution that serves the purpose of training officers for higher level leadership positions. Cadets who study at the academy are enrolled for at least 2 years. It was the first institution of its kind to be established on the militaries of Central Asia. The school requires all cadets to be fluent in the Uzbek language as well as have a basic knowledge of Russian.

History
It was established on 2 September 1994 in accordance with the resolution of the Cabinet of Ministers of the Republic of Uzbekistan "On Establishment of the Academy of Armed Forces of the Republic of Uzbekistan" of 15 August 1994. In January 2017, President Shavkat Mirziyoyev visited the school to give instructions on the organization of an entirely new academy on its basis. While addressing the school administration, noted the importance reestablishing the academy, stating the following:

The reorganization resolution was adopted by presidential decree on 25 April 2017. In late 2017, the Uzbek government signed an agreement with China on cooperation between the school and educational institutions in the PLA. Around the same time, former defense minister Qobul Berdiyev became rector of the academy. In May 2018, Russian defense minister Sergey Shoygu inspected the historical halls of the academy.

Functions 
The academy serves all branches of the armed forces, rather than just the Uzbek Ground Forces. Cadets in the academy specialize in the highest command of the military, scientific studies, as well as operational experience for senior officers, studying the problems of military science in order to increase professional and qualitative training of officers and to explore practical issues of military policy and the development of the armed forces. Teachers are commissioned officers in the Ministry of Defense, as well as retired military personnel, and experts leading higher education institutions.

Institutions 
The Academy has 3 faculties:

 General Staff Faculty
 Command - Staff Faculty
 Faculty of Advanced Training

Graduates of the General Staff Faculty of the Armed Forces Academy are awarded the rank of lieutenant, a diploma of higher education and a driver's license. The General Staff Faculty of the Armed Forces Academy trains officers in the following specialties:

 Motorized Rifleman and Border Troops Commander (4 years)

 Officers of tactical command of educational and ideological work (4 years)

 Army Intelligence Tactical Command Officers (4 years)

 Officers of the Front Tactical Command (4 years)

 Chemical Tactical Command Officers (4 years)

 Engineer Tactical Command Officers (4 years)

Rectors 
 Vladimir Makhmudov (circa 1995)
 Kadyr Gulyamov (1999 - 2000)
 Qobul Berdiyev (4 September 2017 - 1 May 2018)
 Colonel Shavkat Mamazhonov (since 23 March 2021)

Alumni 

 Colonel Zoirjon Bozorboev, Deputy Defense Minister for Logistics 
 Colonel Farhodjon Shermatov, Commander of the Northwest Military District
 Colonel Ulugbek Dusmatov, Deputy Commander for Educational and Ideological Work of the Northwest Military District
Bakhodir Tashmatov, Commander of the Uzbekistan National Guard

References

External links
Alumni website
ТВОКУ 100 лет

2017 establishments
1994 establishments in Uzbekistan
Military academies of Uzbekistan